Western Sydney Wanderers Youth is the academy system of Western Sydney Wanderers Football Club based in Sydney, New South Wales, Australia. The team competes in the National Youth League competition known as the Y-League and also the National Premier Leagues NSW Men's First Grade, Under 20s and Under 18s competitions.
For the 2020 season, they were to play in the NSW NPL 2 league. However due to a delayed season and restart, they were promoted to the National Premier Leagues NSW.

In addition, the club submits teams into the Football NSW Boys’ Youth Competitions at U13, U14, U15 and U16 level.

Youth team history
The team was founded in 2012, as a Western Sydney Wanderers representative team for the National Youth League competition, replacing the defunct Gold Coast United. In 2016 the team was admitted to the National Premier Leagues NSW.

Youth current squad

Facilities
The Wanderers training facility & academy is located at the Wanderers Centre of Football in Rooty Hill. The team plays in Wanderers Football Park.

Honours
 Y-League/A-League Youth Premiership
 Premiers (2): 2017–18, 2018–19
 Runners-up (1): 2016–17
 Y-League/A-League Youth Championship
 Champions (1): 2017–18
 Runners-up (1): 2018–19
 NSW NPL 2/NSW League One Premiership
 Runners-up (1): 2016
 NSW NPL 2/NSW League One Championship
 Runners-up (1): 2016
 Football NSW League One Youth U-20 Premiership
 Runners-up (3): 2016, 2017, 2018
 Football NSW League One Youth U-20 Championship
 Champions (3): 2017, 2018, 2022
 Runners-up (1): 2016
 Football NSW League One Youth U-18 Premiership
 Premiers (1): 2016

 Football NSW League One Youth U-18 Championship
 Champions (2): 2016, 2017
 Runners-up (1): 2018

See also
 Western Sydney Wanderers FC
 Western Sydney Wanderers FC (W-League)

References

External links
 Official website

Western Sydney Wanderers FC
National Premier Leagues clubs
Soccer clubs in Sydney
Association football clubs established in 2012
2012 establishments in Australia